Excition is an album by pianist Hilton Ruiz recorded in 1977 and released on the Danish label SteepleChase.

Reception

The AllMusic review by Ken Dryden states "Excition is a strong example of Ruiz's ability as both a performer and arranger".

Track listing 
 "Dedicated to the Cooker" (Hilton Ruiz) – 10:15
 "Excition" (Frank Foster) – 10:35
 "The House That Love Built" (Foster) – 7:25
 "Blues for Becky" (Richard Williams) – 10:48
 "Origin" (Pharoah Sanders) – 9:43 Additional track on CD

Personnel 
Hilton Ruiz – piano
Richard Williams – trumpet 
Frank Foster – tenor saxophone 
Buster Williams – bass
Roy Brooks – drums

References 

Hilton Ruiz albums
1977 albums
SteepleChase Records albums